The definition of world's busiest airport has been specified by the Airports Council International in Montreal, Canada. The ACI defines and measures the following three types of airport traffic:
Passenger traffic: total passengers embarked and disembarked, passengers in transit counted once
Cargo traffic: loaded and unloaded freight and mail, by mass
Traffic movements: landings and take-offs of aircraft

Busiest airports
The following airports make claims based on objective volume measures that are defined above (as per ACI):

Hartsfield–Jackson Atlanta International Airport, Atlanta, Georgia, United States
Most passengers annually (1998–2019, 2021–present)
Most aircraft movements annually (2015–present)

Guangzhou Baiyun International Airport, Guangzhou, Guangdong, China
Most passengers annually (2020)

Dubai International Airport, Dubai, United Arab Emirates
Most international passengers annually (2014–present)

Memphis International Airport, Memphis, Tennessee, United States
Most cargo traffic by weight annually (2020–2021)

Hong Kong International Airport, New Territories, Hong Kong, Hong Kong SAR.
Most cargo traffic by weight annually (2022-Present)

Busiest city destination 
Airports of London combined, London, United Kingdom
Most passengers annually in all city airports combined (2010–present)

Historical claims
Midway International Airport, Chicago, Illinois, United States
In the late 1940s, Chicago Midway was the busiest airport in the United States by total aircraft operations – i.e., including every training aircraft practicing take-offs and landings. New York LaGuardia had the most airline operations and passengers until the early 1950s, when Chicago Midway became the busiest airport in the United States by any criterion. Before World War II, Chicago Midway was the origin or destination of one in four U.S. airline flights, although a 1939 Official Aviation Guide shows more airline flights scheduled at Newark than at Chicago.

Memphis International Airport, Memphis, Tennessee, United States
As the home of FedEx Express, Memphis had the largest cargo operations worldwide from 1993 to 2009. It remains the busiest cargo airport in the United States and the Western Hemisphere.

See also

 Lists of airports
 List of busiest airports by passenger traffic
 List of busiest airports by international passenger traffic
 List of busiest airports by cargo traffic
 List of busiest city airport systems by passenger traffic
 List of the busiest airports in the European Union
 List of the busiest airports in the Nordic countries
 List of the busiest airports in the Baltic states
 List of the busiest airports in Central America
 List of busiest airports in the United Kingdom
 List of the busiest airports in the Republic of Ireland
 List of the busiest airports in Turkey
 List of largest cargo airports in the United States

References

External links
Airports Council International website. A representative industry body for the airport industry that provides air travel statistics.

 

de:Liste der größten Verkehrsflughäfen